Gwyneth Powell (5 July 1946 – 8 September 2022) was an English actress. She was best known for her portrayal of headmistress Bridget McClusky in the BBC television series Grange Hill for eleven series between 1981 and 1991.

Background
Powell was born on 5 July 1946 in Levenshulme, Manchester, and attended Cheadle County Grammar School for Girls, during which time she appeared to some acclaim as Fat Urs in the National Youth Theatre's production of Ben Jonson's Bartholemew Fair. She originally trained as a teacher at Goldsmiths, University of London, but instead chose to act in repertory theatre.

Career
Powell's first major television role was in the 1971 LWT dystopian drama series, The Guardians. She was a regular, if minor, player in many television dramas until being cast in Grange Hill, in which she played the "firm but fair" headmistress Bridget ("The Midget") McClusky for eleven years. Of her role, she said in 2008:

Eventually, however, Powell wanted to pursue other interests and gave the Grange Hill producers and writers a year to write McClusky out of the series. She bought the rights to E. M. Delafield's Diary of a Provincial Lady and adapted it as a self-financed one-woman show in Edinburgh, also touring the production.

Since then, Powell appeared in other television programmes such as Heartbeat, A Touch of Frost, Holby City, Hetty Wainthropp Investigates and Father Brown, and in 2008, Echo Beach. She played the role of a school teacher in a Victorian School Day in an episode of the BBC Schools TV series Watch. In 2009, using archive footage, coupled with some newly recorded lines, Powell reprised her Grange Hill role as Mrs McClusky for a cameo appearance in an episode of Ashes to Ashes, set in 1982. She also appeared in Arsenic and Old Lace at the Salisbury Playhouse. In 2010, Powell starred as Nana in The Gemma Factor. Subsequently, in 2011–2013, she became a support character in the teen programme House of Anubis, playing the role of Nina Martin's gran who ends up in hospital but is later released. She featured in seven episodes. In 2013 she took the role of Greg Davies' mother Polly Davies in the Channel 4 comedy Man Down.

Personal life
Powell married actor Alan Leith in 1971. She lived in Hurstpierpoint, West Sussex, where she was a patron of a local drama group, the Hurstpierpoint Players.

She died in Brighton on 8 September 2022 at age 76. Her death was attributed to complications following surgery for a perforated colon.

Filmography

References

External links
 

1946 births
2022 deaths
Actresses from Manchester
Alumni of Goldsmiths, University of London
English television actresses
People from Hurstpierpoint
People from Levenshulme
20th-century English actresses
21st-century English actresses